The 80th running of the Tour of Flanders cycling race in Belgium was held on Sunday 7 April 1996. Italian Michele Bartoli won the monument classic ahead of Fabio Baldato and Johan Museeuw. The race started in Sint-Niklaas and finished in Meerbeke (Ninove).

Race summary
A group of 11, containing all favourites, was at the foot of the Muur van Geraardsbergen, when defending champion and race favourite Johan Museeuw had a lingering rear wheel and was distanced on the climb. Michele Bartoli attacked on the steep upper slopes of the Muur and pushed on over the Bosberg towards the finish. The stylish Italian won with a minute lead over the chase group where team mate Fabio Baldato won the sprint ahead of a returning Museeuw.

Climbs
There were sixteen categorized climbs:

Results

External links
Recap of the 1996 Tour of Flanders (Flemish television)

References

1996
1996 in road cycling
1996 in Belgian sport
1996 UCI Road World Cup
April 1996 sports events in Europe